Jammerbugt Municipality is a municipality (Danish: kommune) in the North Jutland Region on the North Jutlandic Island. It is located along the coast of Skagerrak to the north and the Limfjord to the south. It borders the municipalities of Thisted, Vesthimmerland, Aalborg, Brønderslev and Hjørring.

Jammerbugt Municipality was formed during the municipal reform of 2007, when the municipalities of Brovst Municipality, Fjerritslev Municipality, Pandrup Municipality and Aabybro Municipality were merged.

Since the municipality's foundation in 2007 the mayor has been Mogens Christian Gade of the Venstre party. Mogens Christian Gade was also the mayor of Brovst Municipality since 2002 and until it was dissolved in 2007.

The name of the region, the Jammerbugt, translating to the Bay of Woe, was originally given due to the numerous shipwrecks laid there.

The municipality include the uninhabited islands of Fruensholm and Troldholme.

History
In the Middle Ages, Denmark was divided into syssels. The area that currently make up Jammerbugt Municipality was known as Han Hundred (Danish: Han Herred) and belonged to the syssel of Thysyssel. It later came under the fief of Aalborghus. In 1662 Han Hundred was merged with a number of hundreds and came under Åstrup, Sejlstrup, Børglum County. The county lasted until 1793. Vester Han Hundred, making up approximately half of the current Jammerbugt Municipality's borders, came under Thisted County, while Øster Han Hundred and Hvetbo Hundred, making up the other half, came under Hjørring County. These counties lasted until the 1970 Danish Municipal Reform where they came under the North Jutland County.

In 1842 Denmark was divided into smaller administrative divisions, namely parish municipalities (Danish: sognekommunner). The borders of these municipalities were largely based on the country's parishes. In the 1970 municipal reform these parish municipalities were dissolved. Three parish municipalities were merged to create Aabybro Municipality, three were merged to form Pandrup Municipality and seven were merged to form Fjerritslev Municipality. Five parish municipalities had been merged already in 1966 to form Brovst Parish Municipality. This parish municipality was changed to become Brovst Municipality in 1970.

Historical divisions
The table below shows the historical municipal subdivisions of Jammerbugt Municipality.

Towns 
These are settlements in the municipality with populations of at least 200 inhabitants (2020).

Aabybro

Aabybro is the main city of the municipality and the seat of the municipal council. It is located in the eastern part of the municipality.

North of the town is an ice cream factory from 1888, Aabybro Dairy (Danish: Aabybro Mejeri). Also to the north is an efterskole, as well as Aaby Church and many residential areas. Along the town's main road, on the western part of town, is a number of shops and amenities, including a school and a library. The remainder of the western, central and eastern parts of Aabybro are mainly residential areas. The southern part of the town has an industrial area, which also includes a number of shops and a school.

Fjerritslev

Fjerritslev is located 28 km west of Aabybro, 35 km northeast of Thisted and 13 km north of Løgstør.

In the town is a number of shops and amenities, including a cinema. Fjerritslev Brewery- and Local Museum (Danish: Fjerritslev Bryggeri- og Egnsmuseum) is also located in the town, and tells about the history of brewery, as well as the local history. In the summer, Fjerritslev hosta a weekly market along its main street.

Pandrup

Pandrup is located in the northern part of the municipality, 1 km north of Kås, 4 km north of Aabybro and 15 km southwest of Brønderslev.

It is located close to nearby vacation homes, and hosts a yearly shopping event during the summer. A sports center is also located in the town.

Brovst

Brovst is located centrally in the municipality, 15 km southwest of Aabybro and 16 km east of Fjerritslev.

The central location of the town allows for easy access to the many nature areas located centrally in the municipality.

Villages

With no major towns in the municipality, many citizens of Jammerbugt Municipality live in villages. Only Aabybro, Fjerritslev, Pandrup, Kås, Brovst and Skovsgård has a relatively high population density, with the rest of the municipality being much less densely populated. This leads to a lot of small villages and scattered settlements.

One of Denmark's biggest amusement parks, Fårup Summer Park, is located by the villages of Hune and Saltum.

Grønhøj, located in the northern part of the municipality, is connected to Løkken and is a large area with vacation homes. The area include a number of amenities, including a public pool and sports hall.

In the village of Hune is the Museum for paper art (Danish: Museum for papirkunst).

In addition to these villages, there are a number of smaller settlements in the municipality. These are all the settlements with populations of less than 200 people:

Nature

There are many nature areas in the municipality, and many of them are protected. The municipality is also located by the Limfjord, which is a large fjord that separates the North Jutlandic Island from mainland Jutland. The fjord is home to a large variety of flora and fauna.

A beach, heath and dune area known as Grønnestrand and Svinkløv was protected in 1972. The area is an important place for breeding birds, with a large variety of birds breeding here.

Hingelbjerge is a forest and heath which has been protected since 1968. 129 acres are protected.

Southeast of Fjerritslev are 136 protected acres of heath and forest. This area is known as Skårhøjene. In the forest breed several birds, including the European green woodpecker and Eurasian nuthatch.

Other protected nature areas in the municipality include the hills of Alsbjerg Hills (Danish: Alsbjerg Bakker), covering 40 acres. Also protected is approximately 9 acres around the large rock of Janum Kjøt.

Dune plantations

In the northwestern corner of the municipality, bordering Thisted Municipality, is Vester Thorup Dune Plantation (Danish: Vester Thorup Klitplantage). In it is a small protected area. It's a chalk cliff with a unique flora known as Valbjerg Sande.

Vester Thorup Dune Plantation is home to a rich flora, including plants such as drug eyebright, deer fern, wintergreen, rought horsetail, lesser twayblade, marsh helleborine, butterwort, moonwort, Danish kidneyvetch and field gentian.

Although the flora is similar in most of the dune plantations along the municipality's coast, there are slight differences. In the Fosdal Plantation, located slightly north between Fjerritslev and Brovst, is a heath which is home to the wolf's bane, a rare plant in Denmark.

The fauna in the municipality's dune plantation include many birds and insects. There are mammals, such as polecats and hares, though there generally aren't many mammals in the dune plantations. Tranum Dune Plantation, west of Pandrup, has a population of roe deer, as does Blokhus Dune Plantation further north.

The carpenter ant can be found in Vester Thorup Dune Plantation. The marsh fritillary, rare in Denmark, can be found in Tranum Dune Plantation.

Birds breeding in the plantations include nightjar, redstart, European pied flycatcher and red-backed shrike. During the winter the white-throated dipper can be found in Svinkløv Plantation and Kollerup Plantation.

A large area of 3,000 acres is protected, including parts of Fosdal Plantation and Langdal Plantation. It was protected in 1902, then expanded again in 1954, 1956, 1962 and 2009. Also protected is seven separate areas, amounting to 415 acres total, located between Rødhus and Løkken.

Klim Dune Plantation can also be found in the municipality, located between the plantations of Vester Thorup and Kollerup.

Store Vildmose

Store Vildmose is a bogland located north of Aabybro. It is the remnant of an extensive raised peat bog, in large part drained by constructed canals in the early 20th century. Some areas are still relatively untouched and give an impression of the original nature of this bog. 1895 acres are protected.

The bogland is home to the cloudberry, which is a rare plant in Denmark. The Eurasian otter can be found here.

Jammerbugten Seafloor 
The coast of Jammerbugt forms a stretch of sandy beaches in an inwardly curved bay called Jammerbugten. The seafloor contains many shipwrecks which provide marine habitats for wildlife. It was thought that the majority of the Jammerbugten’s seafloor was sandy with a low density of species, until a 2020 seafloor mapping project, ran by danish explorer Klaus Thymann, found evidence of much greater biodiversity in a range seafloor habitats. The area is subject to further exploration in order to protect it from destructive fishing practices, preserving newly documented species such as Dead Man’s Finger coral, which had never before been recorded in the area.

Politics
In the municipal reform of 2007, the municipalities of Brovst Municipality, Fjerritslev Municipality, Pandrup Municipality and Aabybro Municipality were merged to form the current Jammerbugt Municipality.

Municipal council
Jammerbugt's municipal council consists of 27 members, elected every four years.

Below are the municipal councils elected since the Municipal Reform of 2007.

Mayors
Since the 2007 municipal reform, the mayors of Jammerbugt Municipality have been:

Economy
The largest industries by number of employees in Jammerbugt Municipality are social institutions, retail, farming and fishing.

Companies with their headquarter in the municipality include Migatronic, a large welding machine company. The company's headquarter is set in Fjerritslev and the company has existed since 1970. Also in the municipality is Aabybro Dairy (Danish: Aabybro Mejeri), located in Aabybro. The dairy is home to the company Ryå Is, an ice cream factory.

Demographics

There are 38,324 people living in Jammerbugt Municipality (2020). 49.40% are women and 50.60% are men.

Below is the age distribution of the municipality.

Education
There are 12 ground schools, 4 efterskoles, 4 independent schools and 1 music school in the municipality.

There are 4 libraries in the municipality.

Sights

The municipality is a popular vacation area in the summer, with numerous areas with vacation homes. As a result, the  sights in the area are mostly open in the summer.

Fårup Summer Park (Danish: Fårup Sommerland) is an amusement park located north of Pandrup. The park covers 90 acres and was first opened in 1975. It was the first summer park in Scandinavia.
The Museum for paper art (Danish: Museum for papirkunst) is located in the village of Hune. The museum displays paper art, and also offers dining and venue services.
Blokhus Sculpture Park (Danish: Blokhus Skulpturpark) is located in Hune. It is a park of sand sculptures.
The Local Collection (Danish: Egnssamlingen) is a local museum in Saltum. The museum's focus is on the history of the surrounding area, approximately the territory of the former Pandrup Municipality. The museum also acts as the area's local archive.
The Troll Museum (Danish: Troldemuseet) is a museum about the troll figures carved by Thomas Dam. The museum is located in Gjøl.
Fjerritslev Brewery and Local Museum (Danish: Fjerritslev Bryggeri- og Egnsmuseum) is located in Fjerritslev. It is both a brewery museum and a local museum.

Castles and manors

Birkelse is a manor located west of Aabybro. It is named after Birkelse Skov, a nearby birch forest. The manor has belonged to the Skeel family since the middle of the 1600s.
Birkumgaard is a manor located east of Gjøl. It belonged to Børglum Monastery from 1465 and until 1536 where it was taken by the crown.
Bratskov is a manor located north of Brovst. It is known to have existed since at least 1317, though sources mention it from as early as the later half of the 1200s. It was owned by the Torstensen family in 1317, and remained in their possession until 1558. The manor was acquired by Brovst Municipality in 1976. In the 2007 municipal reform it was transferred to Jammerbugt Municipality.
Kokkedal is a manor located south of Torslev. It is known to have existed since at least 1327. During the Thirty Years' War the forests of Kokkedal were cut down and never recovered. The manor house was bought by the Ministry of Social Affairs in 1948, and turned into a school house for boys. It returned into private ownership in 1988.
Oxholm is a manor located south of Brovst. It is a former monastery, formerly named Ø Kloster.
Rævkærgaard is a manor located northwest of Aabybro. The manor has existed since the 1500s and has been in the Skeel family since the 1600s.
Aagaard is a manor located slightly south of Fjerritslev. It is known to have existed since at least 1355, where it was in the Gyldenstierne family. During peasant rebellions in 1438—1441 the manor was taken by the rebels. It was looted and burned. Aagaard was in the Gyldenstierne family until 1627, when Knud Gyldenstierne died. His widow, Sophie Lindenov, sold the manor to her mother in 1630, ending the Gyldenstierne's reign over the manor.

Churches
See List of churches in Jammerbugt Municipality

Events
The Saltum Wool Festival (Danish: Uldfestival Saltum) is a yearly event hosted in Saltum. The event focuses on wool, yarn and clothes and has existed since 2007. The event is the largest of its kind in Scandinavia.

Parishes

There are 28 parishes in Jammerbugt Municipality. Shown in the table below are the populations of each parish, as well as the percentage of that population that are members of the Church of Denmark. All numbers are from 1 January 2020.

Symbols

The coat of arms of Jammerbugt Municipality is named Fuglen (Danish for "The Bird"). It was accepted by the city council on 6 June 2006. It features a white bird dividing the coat of arms in half. One half is blue, the other is green. The blue represents the ocean around Jammerbugt Municipality, with the green representing the land. The bird is free and embraces the entire area as a whole, while marking the coastline of Jammerbugt Municipality. The bird is looking ahead, to represent the municipality's vision and ambitions. It is meant to symbolise unity, openness, focus on the future and recreational nature areas.

Notable residents

Public thought and politics
 Jens Haven (1724 in Vust — 1796), missionary in Canada
 Henriette Nielsen (1815 in Vester Torup — 1900), author
 Kirsten Kjær (1893–1985), painter
 Helle Juul (born 1954 in Vester Hjermitslev), architect
 Ole Christensen (born 1955 in Pandrup), politician and former MEP
 Mogens Gade (born 1961 in Øster Svenstrup), politician and mayor of the municipality
 Lone Drøscher Nielsen (born 1964 in Aabybro), wildlife conservationist
 Thomas Danielsen (born 1983 in Fjerritslev), politician and MF
 Ane Halsboe-Jørgensen (born 1983 in Brovst), politician and MF

Sport
 Hans Nielsen (born 1959 in Brovst), speedway rider
 Rikke Nielsen (born 1977 in Fjerritslev), handball player
 Pernille Holmsgaard (born 1984 in Pandrup), handball player
 Nicolaj Ritter (born 1992 in Brovst), football player
 Kasper Pedersen (born 1993 in Aabybro), football player
 Søren Reese (born 1993 in Ingstrup), football player
 Mikkel B. Andersen (born 1996 in Fjerritslev), speedway rider

References

External links 

  
 VisitJammerbugten, official tourism website

 
Municipalities of the North Jutland Region
Municipalities of Denmark
Populated places established in 2007